Wojciech Sławomir Kurpiewski (16 February 1966 – 8 October 2016) was a Polish sprint canoer who competed from the mid-1980s to the mid-1990s. Kurpiewski was born in Nowy Dwór Mazowiecki.

Competing in two Summer Olympics, he won a silver medal in the K-2 500 m event at Barcelona in 1992.

Kurpiewski also won five medals at the ICF Canoe Sprint World Championships with three silvers (K-2 500 m: 1993, K-4 500 m: 1987, K-4 1000 m: 1989) and two bronzes (K-2 500 m: 1989, K-4 1000 m: 1986). He died at the age of 50 on 8 October 2016.

References

DatabaseOlympics.com profile

Pkol.pl profile 
Sports-reference.com profile

1966 births
Canoeists at the 1988 Summer Olympics
Canoeists at the 1992 Summer Olympics
2016 deaths
Olympic canoeists of Poland
Olympic silver medalists for Poland
Polish male canoeists
Olympic medalists in canoeing
People from Nowy Dwór Mazowiecki
ICF Canoe Sprint World Championships medalists in kayak
Sportspeople from Masovian Voivodeship
Medalists at the 1992 Summer Olympics